Eva Knowles Johnson (born 1946) is an Aboriginal Australian poet, actor, director and playwright.

Early life
Eva Knowles Johnson belongs to the Malak Malak people and was born in 1946 at Daly River in the Northern Territory. At the age of two, Johnson was taken from her mother and placed on a Methodist Mission on Croker Island and at the age of 10 was transferred to an orphanage in Adelaide.

Career
Johnson worked as an enrolled nurse and studied community development at the South Australian Institute of Technology and a degree in Aboriginal studies at the University of Adelaide.
 
Johnson has worked as a poet, actor, director, playwright and teacher. She began writing in 1979.  Her first poem became the title of the first play ever produced by Black Theatre in Adelaide, When I Die You'll All Stop Laughing.

Johnson contributed to the representation of Aboriginal women on the stage. Johnson's writing addresses themes of cultural identity, Aboriginal Australian women's rights, the stolen generation, land rights, slavery, sexism and homophobia. Johnson played the part of Alice Wilson (credited as Eva Birrit) in the fourth segment of the 1981 award-winning series Women of the Sun.

In 1984 Johnson directed the first Aboriginal Women's Art Festival in Adelaide and wrote a play for the festival entitled Tjindarella. The play examined the oppression of Aboriginal Australians and highlighted the effects of government policy on the forced removal of children from their parents and culture. Tjindarella was also performed at the Adelaide Fringe Festival in 1984. Johnson was writer/director of the first National Black Playwrights Conference in Canberra, 1987, from which the Aboriginal National Theatre Trust was developed.

In 1989 Johnson's play Mimini's Voices was produced by Magpie Theatre in Adelaide and later restaged in 1990 as part of the Hiroshima Arts festival in Japan where it won the Festival Peace Prize awarded by the Lord Mayor of Hiroshima.

Johnson continued to write plays into the 1990s, with titles including Heart Beat of the Earth, Two Bob in the Quid, What Do They Call Me and Mimini's Voices.  She has received a number of awards for her work.  She is still living in Adelaide today and continues her work as a guest speaker at various educational institutions.

Awards
 In 1985 Johnson was awarded the Aboriginal Artist of the Year Award.

Australia Council for the Arts
The Australia Council for the Arts is the arts funding and advisory body for the Government of Australia. Since 1993, it has awarded a Red Ochre Award. It is presented to an outstanding Indigenous Australian (Aboriginal Australian or Torres Strait Islander) artist for lifetime achievement.

|-
| 1993
| herself
| Red Ochre Award
| 
|-

Works
A letter to my mother
When I Die You'll All Stop Laughing
Faded Genes
Mimini's Voices
Murras
Onward To Glory
Tjindarella
What do they call me
Heartbeat of the Earth

References

Further reading

External links 

Eva Johnson Enciclopedia delle donne

1946 births
Living people
Australian indigenous rights activists
Women human rights activists
Australian dramatists and playwrights
Australian feminist writers
Indigenous Australian feminists